Sportvereniging Tielse Eendracht Combinatie, more commonly known as SV TEC or simply TEC, is a football club based in Tiel, Gelderland. Formed on 1 June 1924, it plays in the Tweede Divisie, the third tier of the Dutch football league system, and has spent most of its history in the lower amateur tiers. Its home ground is Sportpark De Lok.

History
TEC was founded on 1 June 1924 as a merger of four clubs in Tiel, Gelderland. Initially, Amical, Hercules and Inter Amicos joined forces. Later Houdt Stand also participated in the merger which was called Tielse Eendracht Combinatie (TEC). Despite a difficult start, which saw economical difficulties, the club managed to reach promotion to the Tweede Klasse during the 1930s and another Tiel-based side, Velox, participated in the merger.

In the 1951–52 season, TEC finally won promotion to the Eerste Klasse after beating SC Emma. It would only last one season at that level, and the club subsequently suffered two successive relegations, ending up in the Derde Klasse.

The following decades mostly saw TEC bounce around between the Tweede and Derde Klasse, the second and third level of amateur football, respectively. In the season that TEC celebrated its 60th anniversary, they won promotion to the Tweede Klasse. The club played an anniversary match against Dutch champions Feyenoord in 1984. At home ground "De Lok", TEC faced players such as Sjaak Troost, Ivan Nielsen, Ben Wijnstekers, Ruud Gullit and Tiel native Simon Tahamata. More than 3,000 spectators watch their club lose 8–1 to Feyenoord. The second half of the 1980s was successful for TEC. Under manager and former player Henk van Tricht the club promoted to the Eerste Klasse for the first time in decades.

Between 2002 and 2004, TEC managed to compete in the Hoofdklasse, which was the highest amateur level at the time. From 2010, where the club played in the Derde Klasse again after successive relegations, they experienced a highly successful period under the leadership of head coach and former player Hanky Leatemia. Three championships and one play-off appearance later, TEC promoted to the Topklasse, which later became known as the Derde Divisie, the fourth tier in the Dutch football league system. Under the guidance of manager Frits van den Berk, TEC finished just behind FC Lienden to claim second place. This meant that promotion to the third-tier Tweede Divisie became a fact in 2016 – the highest ranking in club history. The performance occurred after the club board, sponsors and volunteers joined forces in 2010 to develop a five-year plan known as Project TEC, with the goal of propelling TEC to the top divisions. Gery Vink, former professional player at FC Wageningen and youth developer at Vitesse, PSV and Ajax, had been recruited to realise the plan which was finally achieved with the promotion.

Current squad

Competition results 1926–2016

References

External links
 Official site 

SV TEC
Football clubs in the Netherlands
Association football clubs established in 1924
1924 establishments in the Netherlands
Football clubs in Gelderland
Sport in Tiel